Redhills was a former station on the Cavan to Clones Great Northern Railway (Ireland) line eight and a half miles north east of the town of Cavan opened on 1 December 1873.

See also
List of closed railway stations in Ireland

References

Disused railway stations in County Cavan
Railway stations opened in 1873
Railway stations closed in 1957